Justin Crawford may refer to:

 Justin Crawford (American football) (born 1995), American football running back
 Justin Crawford (Australian footballer) (1977–2022),  Australian rules footballer
 Justin Crawford (baseball), American baseball player